Kenneth William David Jack AM MBE RWS, (5 October 1924 – 10 June 2006) was an Australian watercolour artist who specialised in painting the images of an almost forgotten outback life: old mine workings, ghost towns, decaying farm buildings.

Family
The son of Harold James Jack (1901–1977), and Ethel Gertrude Jack (1892–1950), née Orr, Kenneth William David Jack was born in Malvern on 5 October 1924.

His son-in-law Fred Schmidt is also an Australian watercolour artist.

Artist
He became a professional painter at the age of 39 after giving up his job as senior instructor at the Caulfield Institute of Technology, and continued as a prolific painter until his death in June 2006.

Recognition
 1977: elected to the Royal Watercolour Society.
 1982: awarded the MBE: "for service to the arts".
 1987: awarded the Order of Australia (AM): "for service to the arts, particularly to watercolour painting".

The Kenneth Jack Memorial Drawing Award
The Kenneth Jack Memorial Drawing Award was established in his honour in 2007 by The Australian Guild of Realist Artists. The inaugural winner was Margaret Gurney.

Collections
Kenneth Jack's works can be found in these collections:
Royal Collection at Windsor.
Victoria and Albert museum.
National Gallery of Australia.
The Australian War Memorial
The capital city collections of every Australian state.

Notes

References
 World War Two Nominal Roll: Corporal Kenneth William David Jack (125555), Department of Veterans' Affairs.

External links
 Melbourne Age "Melbourne in a past light" 22 June 2005 retrieved 20 June 2006
 Kenneth Jack at Australian Art
 Kenneth Jack website

1924 births
2006 deaths
RMIT University alumni
Members of the Order of Australia
Australian Members of the Order of the British Empire
20th-century Australian painters
20th-century Australian male artists
Australian male painters